The urogenital opening is where bodily waste and reproductive fluids are expelled to the environment outside of the body cavity. In some organisms, including birds and many fish, discharge from the urological, digestive, and reproductive systems empty into a common sac called the cloaca.

In placental mammals, these three systems are more separated. In females, separate orifices have evolved for all three, while in males, a common urinary meatus discharges both urine and semen from the urethra.

References

Pelvis